The Braid Hills form an area towards the south-western edge of Edinburgh, Scotland.

The hills themselves are largely open space. Housing in the area is mostly confined to detached villas, and some large terraced houses. The Braid Hills Hotel sits above Pentland Terrace and Comiston Road, overlooking the park across the road.

The area is well known for its golf course and its views of the city, and is a popular destination for families taking children sledging in the winter. There is also a riding stables and school, eastwards towards Liberton, which arranges pony trekking.

Nearby areas are Morningside to the north, Comiston to the west, and Liberton to the east.

The core of the name is shared with the Braid Burn and the nearby Hermitage of Braid woodland park.

External links

 Braidburn Valley Park
 http://www.edinburghleisure.co.uk/venues/braid-hills-golf-course
 Braids United Golf Club
 Edinburgh Thistle Golf Club
 Harrison Golf Club
 Gazetteer of Scotland entry on the Hermitage of Braid

Parks and commons in Edinburgh
Areas of Edinburgh
Hills of Edinburgh